The Canadian Special Air Service Company was a Canadian Airborne Special Forces unit in operation between 1947 and 1949.

Role
As opposed to a purely military function, the Canadian SAS was originally given functions of airborne firefighting, search and rescue and aid to the civil powers.  However, once officially sanctioned, the SAS was assigned the functions of being initially a parachute company but able to be the cadre of up to three parachute battalions, provide demonstrations of their capabilities throughout the nation, and "preserve and advance the techniques of SAS (Commando) operations developed during World War II".

The Canadian SAS Company performed an arctic rescue mission in 1947 and provided flood relief efforts in the Fraser Valley in 1948.

Commander
Appointed as the Second-in-Command, but acting as the first and only Officer Commanding of the unit was Major Lionel Guy d'Artois, a savate instructor who served in World War II with the Royal 22nd Regiment, First Special Service Force and "F" Section of Special Operations Executive in France.

Organisation
The company was formed as a standard infantry company with a company headquarters and three platoons; a fourth "services" platoon added in 1948. The unit had no distinctive insignia.

Disbandment
The Canadian SAS Company carried on in its mission of providing the nucleus of an airborne battalion that became the Mobile Striking Force in 1949, replacing the SAS.

See also
Special Air Service, the elite unit of the British Army.
First Special Service Force, an elite joint American-Canadian unit of the Second World War.
Canadian Airborne Regiment, also an elite parachute unit of the Canadian Army later created and eventually disbanded.

Notes

External links
http://www.canadiansoldiers.com/organization/specialforces/canadian_sas.htm
http://captainstevens.com/military/military-units/cdn-sas-coy/

Special Air Service
Special forces of Canada
Airborne units and formations of Canada
Military units and formations established in 1947
Military units and formations disestablished in 1949